Julia Bracken Wendt, (1870–1942) a notable American sculptor, was born on June 10, 1871 in Apple River, Illinois, the twelfth of thirteen children in an Irish Catholic family.

Unsupported at home following the death of her mother when she was nine years old, she ran away from home at thirteen.  By sixteen she was working as a domestic servant for a woman who recognized her talent and drive, and paid to enroll her in the Art Institute of Chicago.  There she studied with Lorado Taft and by 1887 she had advanced to become his studio and teaching assistant.   In 1893, during the Columbian Exposition she was one of several women sculptors nicknamed the White Rabbits who helped produce some of the architectural sculpture that graced the exposition buildings.

Aside from that she was awarded a commission to produce Illinois Welcoming the Nations for the Fair.  The work was later cast in bronze and unveiled at the Illinois State Capitol, at which time Governor Altgeld was the main speaker.

After successfully pursuing her career for a number of years, in 1906 she married painter William Wendt and moved to Los Angeles, California where she continued her success. In California she taught at the Otis Art Institute and, with her husband, was instrumental in the founding of the California Art Club in 1909, which was developed on the premise of allowing women and sculptors into the membership.

Wendt was a member of the National Sculpture Society and exhibited and was featured in both the 1923 and 1929 Exhibitions and the resulting catalogues.

She died in Laguna Beach on June 22, 1942.

Work
Her work can be found in:
 Chicago Historical Society
 Civil War Monument, Missionary Ridge, Chattanooga, Tennessee 
 Laguna Art Museum
 Harvard University Portrait Collection
 old Los Angeles City Hall  (now located in the Natural History Museum of Los Angeles County)
 Lincoln Park, Los Angeles, California
 as well as in numerous private collections

References

External links

 
 Image of sculptor Julia Bracken Wendt and Mayor Frank Shaw next to a newly dedicated fountain that includes her work, Los Angeles, California, 1933. Los Angeles Times Photographic Archive (Collection 1429). UCLA Library Special Collections, Charles E. Young Research Library, University of California, Los Angeles.

American women sculptors
1870 births
1942 deaths
Otis College of Art and Design faculty
19th-century American sculptors
20th-century American sculptors
20th-century American women artists
19th-century American women artists
People from Jo Daviess County, Illinois
American women academics